Higher Superstition: The Academic Left and Its Quarrels with Science is a 1994 book about the philosophy of science by the biologist Paul R. Gross and the mathematician Norman Levitt.

Summary

Levitt states he is a leftist trying to save the "academic left" from itself by exposing misuses and abuses of science to advance political goals.

Topics discussed include: cultural constructivism or social constructivism, the strong programme, the science criticism of Stanley Aronowitz and Bruno Latour, post-modernism and deconstructionism and their influence on American academia, the science criticism of Andrew Ross, feminist science criticism, environmentalist science criticism and "apocalyptic naturism", Jeremy Rifkin's influential "pseudoscientific alarmism", attacks on medical research connected with AIDS activism and animal rights advocacy, and Afrocentrism. The book also questions human activity's relationship with climate change. The authors find it unfortunate that social scientists and literary critics often consider themselves qualified to criticize the natural sciences without learning much about them in detail, and worry about what would replace Enlightenment ideals of universalism and rationalism, and objective truths about the natural world as ascertained by a scientific methodology of repeatable experiments, if these were to be discredited, as many science critics in the humanities wish to do.

Reception and influence
The book inspired the 1996 Sokal hoax, in which Alan Sokal published a bogus paper in a postmodernist journal that did not peer-review submissions. Sokal stated in an interview that while he was initially skeptical about Higher Superstition, he concluded after reading the works Gross and Levitt criticized that they were describing them fairly in "about 80 percent of the cases".

See also
 Science wars

Notes and references

Further reading
 Paul R. Gross and Norman Levitt, Higher Superstition: The Academic Left and Its Quarrels With Science (Baltimore: Johns Hopkins University Press, 1994). 
 The Editors of Lingua Franca eds., et al., The Sokal Hoax: The Sham That Shook the Academy (Lincoln: University of Nebraska Press, 2000).  
 Noretta Koertge, ed., A House Built on Sand: Exposing Postmodernist Myths About Science (New York: Oxford University Press, 1998). 
 Paul R. Gross, Norman Levitt, and Martin W. Lewis, The Flight from Science and Reason (New York: New York Academy of Sciences, 1997). 
 James Robert Brown Who Rules in Science: An Opinionated Guide to the Wars (Cambridge, Massachusetts: Harvard University Press, 2001). 
 Ian Hacking, The Social Construction of What (Cambridge, Massachusetts: Harvard University Press, 1999). 
 Norton Wise, "The Enemy Without. The Enemy Within: A Review of Gross and Levitt, Higher Superstition" Isis 87 (1996).

External links
 Higher Superstition – at books.google.com

1994 non-fiction books
Books by Paul R. Gross
Criticism of academia
Criticism of postmodernism
Scientific controversies
English-language books
Johns Hopkins University Press books
Liberalism
Science studies